Sheikh Shems or Melek Shams ad-Din is a holy figure venerated in Yazidism, he is considered one of the Seven Divine Beings, to all of whom God assigned the World's affairs, and his earthly incarnation is considered one of the four sons of Ezdina Mir along with Nasirdîn, Fexredîn, and Sicadîn, who are the respective ancestors and patriarchs of the four Şemsanî Sheikh lineages.

Biography 
Sêx Şems, also known as Şêşims, and Şemsedîn, is one of the members of the Heptad and one of the most fundamental theological symbols in Yazidism as the divinity of the Sun, source of light and life, the divine light of God. He is also linked with fire, which is his terrestrial counterpart and oaths, which are sworn by the doorway of his shrine. Annually, during the Feast of the Assembly, a ceremonial bull sacrifice is performed in front of his shrine in Lalish. Şêx Şems is the eponym of one of the four principal Şemsanî Sheikh lineages, was the patriarch of the Şemsanî family and brother of Fexredîn, Sicadîn and Nasirdîn.

Children
The nine sons of Sheikh Shems are:
Şêx Alê Şemsa
Şêx Amadînê Şemsa
Şêx Avîndê Şemsa 
Şêx Babadînê Şemsa 
Şêx Bavikê Şemsa
Şêx ʿEvdalê Şemsa 
Şêx Hesenê Şemsa 
Şêxê Reş (Cinteyar) 
Şêx Tokilê Şemsa 
Şêx Xidirê Şemsa
His daughters are:
Sitiya Îs/Ês
Sitiya Nisret
Sitiya Bilxan (Belqan)

References

Year of birth unknown
Year of death unknown
Yazidi mythology
Yazidi history
Yazidi religion
12th-century Kurdish people
Yazidi holy figures
Sun myths